Bob Pritchard may refer to:
 Robert W. Pritchard (born 1945), member of the Illinois House of Representatives
 Bob Pritchard (composer) (born 1956), Canadian composer and teacher